Batak Mian, was a cook who saved the life of Mahatma Gandhi from a murder attempt by food poisoning in 1917. He was an employee of an indigo plant at Motihari, Bihar. Afterwards, he was ousted from his job, tortured, and compelled to leave the village.

Incident
Mahatma Gandhi was invited to dinner by the manager of an indigo plant, Erwin. Erwin insisted to his cook, Batak Mian, to add poison to a glass of milk, and to serve to Gandhi. He went to serve, but revealed the plot to Rajendra Prasad. After escaping from the attempt, Mahatma Gandhi continued his protest at Champaran.
The estate manager tortured Batak Mian, lost his house and properties, and was driven out of his village.

After Independence of India
Rajendra Prasad visited Motihari in 1950, as President of India. A crowd formed around him and he recognized Batak Mian from the crowd, and described to the public how the incident happened in 1917. He ordered to grant Batak Mian 50 acres of land as an appreciation from the nation, a promise which was fulfilled by the later Congress government by granting him a 25 acres of land. He died in 1957.

References

People from Bihar
People from Motihari
Gandhians
Year of death missing